This is a list of notable people from Finland. Finland is a Nordic country located between Sweden, Norway and Russia.

Actors

Ida Aalberg (1858–1915)
Miica Patrick Johannes Ruohonen 
Jouko Ahola
Joalin Loukamaa
Olavi Ahonen
Irina Björklund
Anna Easteden
Samuli Edelmann
Peter Franzén
George Gaynes (1927–2019)
Gina Goldberg
Ville Haapasalo
Anna-Leena Härkönen
Ansa Ikonen
Anni-Kristiina Juuso
Kata Kärkkäinen
Krista Kosonen
Marta Kristen
Mikko Leppilampi
Vesa-Matti Loiri
Masa Niemi
Maila "Vampira" Nurmi
Kati Outinen
Jasper Pääkkönen
Turo Pajala
Tauno Palo (1905–1982)
Pertti "Spede" Pasanen (1930–2001)
Matti Pellonpää (1951–1995)
Lasse Pöysti
Pentti Siimes
Maria Silfvan (1800–1865), possibly Finland's first actress
Markku Toikka

Architects

Aino Aalto (1894–1949)
Alvar Aalto (1898–1976)
Marco Casagrande (born 1971)
Herman Gesellius (1874–1916)
Elna Kiljander (1889–1970)
Juha Leiviskä (born 1936)
Yrjö Lindegren (1900–1952)
Armas Lindgren (1874–1929)
Wivi Lönn (1872–1966)
Juhani Pallasmaa (born 1936)
Reima Pietilä (1923–1993)
Viljo Revell (1910–1964)
Aarno Ruusuvuori (1925–1992)
Eero Saarinen (1910–1961)
Eliel Saarinen (1873–1950)
J. S. Sirén (1889–1961)
Lars Sonck (1870–1956)
Josef Stenbäck (1854–1929)
Uno Ullberg (1879–1944)
Martti Välikangas (1893–1973)

Visual artists

Wäinö Aaltonen – sculptor (1894–1966)
Eija-Liisa Ahtila – photographer, video artist (born 1959)
Helena Arnell – painter (1697–1751)
Margareta Capsia – painter (1682–1759)
Emil Cedercreutz – sculptor (1879–1949)
Albert Edelfelt – painter (1854–1905)
Magnus Enckell – painter (1870–1925)
Gunnar Finne – sculptor (1886–1952)
Hilda Flodin – sculptor (1877–1958)
Alina Forsman – sculptor (1845–1899)
Akseli Gallen-Kallela – painter (1865–1931)
Jorma Gallen-Kallela – painter (1898–1939)
Eemil Halonen – sculptor (1875–1950)
Pekka Halonen – painter (1865–1933)
Edvin Hevonkoski – sculptor (1923–2009)
Eila Hiltunen – sculptor (1922–2003)
Kari Huhtamo – sculptor (born 1943)
Tove Jansson – painter, illustrator, and cartoonist of Moomin (1914–2001)
Viktor Jansson – sculptor (1886–1958)
Antti Jokinen – video director in Hollywood (born 1968)
Eero Järnefelt – painter (1863–1937)
Ville Juurikkala – photographer (born 1980)
Rudolf Koivu – illustrator (1890–1946)
Mauri Kunnas (born 1950)
Touko Laaksonen (Tom of Finland) – fetish artist (1920–1991)
Kari T. Leppänen – cartoonist (born 1945)
Otto Maja – graffiti artist (born 1987)
Totte Mannes – painter (born 1933)
Arno Rafael Minkkinen – photographer
Helvi Mustonen – painter (born 1947)
Kalervo Palsa – painter (1947–1987)
Tuulikki Pietilä – graphic artist (1917–2009)
Walter Runeberg – sculptor (1838–1920)
Sampsa – painter and street artist
Helene Schjerfbeck – painter (1862–1946)
Hugo Simberg – painter (1873–1917)
Venny Soldan-Brofeldt – painter (1863–1945)
Kaj Stenvall – painter (born 1951)
Kari Suomalainen – painter and cartoonist (1920–1999)
Reidar Särestöniemi – painter (1925–1981)
Kain Tapper – sculptor (1930–2004)
Ellen Thesleff – painter (1869–1954)
Salla Tykkä
Ville Vallgren – sculptor (1855–1940)
Marja Vallila – sculptor (born 1950)

Business people

Sari Baldauf – former Nokia executive
Jorma Eloranta – CEO of Metso
Aatos Erkko – minister, billionaire and major owner of Sanoma
Maija-Liisa Friman (born 1952) – board member of several companies 
Harry Harkimo – businessman in ice hockey business
Antti Herlin – chairman of the board of KONE, the richest man in Finland with assets worth over 1 billion euros in KONE stock owned through his holding companies
Sara Hildén (1905–1993) – businesswoman and art collector
Fredrik Idestam – industrialist and founder of Nokia
Kari Kairamo – former CEO of Nokia (1932–1988)
Olli-Pekka Kallasvuo – former CEO of Nokia
Jorma Ollila – former CEO of Nokia, Chairman of Royal Dutch Shell
Kirsti Paakkanen – former CEO of Marimekko
Jaana Tuominen – CEO of Paulig (born 1960)
Björn Wahlroos – Chairman of Sampo
Rudolf Walden (1878–1946) – founder of United Paper Mills 
Poju Zabludowicz – billionaire, philanthropist, and owner of Tamares Group

Computer pioneers

Johan Helsingius – creator and operator of The Penet remailer
Aapo Kyrölä – creator of Sulake
Jarkko Oikarinen – creator of Internet Relay Chat (IRC)
Linus Torvalds – initial creator of Linux kernel
Michael Widenius – creator of MySQL
Tatu Ylönen – creator of SSH

Designers

Eero Rislakki
Eero Aarnio
Erik Bruun
Kaj Franck
Maija Isola
Stefan Lindfors
Vuokko Nurmesniemi
Katja Pettersson
Timo Sarpaneva
Esteri Tomula
Tapio Wirkkala

Miica Patrick Johannes Ruohanen

Filmmakers

Zaida Bergroth
Anna Eriksson
Renny Harlin
Erkki Karu (1887–1935)
Aki Kaurismäki
Mika Kaurismäki
Ere Kokkonen (1938–2008)
Juho Kuosmanen
Edvin Laine (1905–1989)
Glory Leppänen (1901–1979)
Aku Louhimies
Risto Orko (1899–2001)
Spede Pasanen (1930–2001)
Diana Ringo
Teuvo Tulio (1912–2000)
Valentin Vaala (1909–1976)

Musicians

Classical

Kalevi Aho – composer
Paavo Berglund – conductor
Linda Brava – violinist
Mikko Franck – conductor
Ralf Gothóni – pianist (father of Maris)
Ilkka Kuusisto – composer
Pekka Kuusisto – conductor, violinist, composer
Jaakko Kuusisto – conductor, violinist, composer
Risto Lauriala – pianist
Hannu Lintu – conductor
Klaus Mäkelä – conductor, cellist
Janne Mertanen – pianist
Olli Mustonen – pianist, composer
Sakari Oramo – conductor
Selim Palmgren – composer, pianist, conductor
Jorma Panula – conductor and conducting educator pioneer
Einojuhani Rautavaara – composer
Herman Rechberger – composer
Santtu-Matias Rouvali – conductor, percussionist
Kaija Saariaho – composer
Esa-Pekka Salonen – conductor, composer
Jukka-Pekka Saraste – conductor
Jean Sibelius – composer
Dalia Stasevska – conductor
John Storgårds – conductor
Elina Vähälä – violinist
Osmo Vänskä – conductor, composer, clarinetist 
Sauli Zinovjev – composer
Diana Ringo – composer

Electronic

Miika Eloranta & Janne Mansnerus – musicians, producers (as Super8 & Tab)
Paavo Siljamäki – DJ and producer; part of a Trance music group Above & Beyond
Jori Hulkkonen – DJ, musician, producer
Petri Kuljuntausta – composer, musician
Erkki Kurenniemi – musician, inventor
Lassi Lehto a.k.a. Jimi Tenor – acid jazz musician
Lassi Nikko a.k.a. Brothomstates a.k.a. Dune – musician
Sasu Ripatti a.k.a. Vladislav Delay – musician, DJ
Esa Juhani Ruoho a.k.a. Lackluster – musician
Jaakko Salovaara a.k.a. JS16 – musician, producer
Mika Vainio – musician, member of Pan Sonic
Ville Virtanen a.k.a. Darude
Ilpo Väisänen – musician, member of Pan Sonic
Heidi Kilpeläinen – multimedia artist, singer and recording artist, known by the stage name HK119
Diana Ringo – composer

Folk

Islaja – acid folk singer
Konsta Jylhä – folk musician
Maria Kalaniemi – folk music accordion player
Sanna Kurki-Suonio – folk music singer
Lau Nau – acid folk singer
Gösta Sundqvist – folk music singer, Leevi and the Leavings' singer
Jenny Wilhelms – folk music singer

Metal

Marko Hietala – bassist and backing vocalist of Nightwish, main vocalist and co-founding member of Tarot
Zachary Hietala – guitarist and co-founding member of Tarot
Sami Hinkka – bassist and lyricist of Ensiferum
Esa Holopainen – Main songwriter, current lead guitarist, and founding member of the Finnish metal band Amorphis
Tuomas Holopainen – composer, songwriter, keyboardplayer and founding member of Nightwish
Jan Jämsen – ex-vocalist and current lyricist of folk metal band Finntroll
Tomi Joutsen – lead singer of Amorphis
Tony Kakko – vocalist, composer and songwriter of Sonata Arctica
Jari Kainulainen – ex-bassist of Stratovarius
Antti Boman – guitarist and vocalist of death metal band Demilich
Perttu Kivilaakso – cellist of cello-metal band Apocalyptica
Timo Kotipelto – lead singer of Stratovarius
Ville Laihiala – frontman of Sentenced and Poisonblack
Alexi Laiho – frontman and lead guitarist of Children of Bodom
Roope Latvala – guitarist of Children of Bodom
Jani Liimatainen – former guitarist for Sonata Arctica
Petri Lindroos – guitarist and main vocalist of Ensiferum and former Norther
Jari Mäenpää – composer, singer and guitarist of Ensiferum and Wintersun
Jukka Nevalainen – drummer of Nightwish
Anne Nurmi – vocalist and keyboard player of Lacrimosa
Janne Parviainen – drummer of Ensiferum, Sinergy and Barathrum
Tomi Putaansuu – frontman and singer of Lordi
Jaska Raatikainen – drummer for Children of Bodom
Sami Raatikainen – guitarist for Necrophagist
Henkka Seppälä – bassist for Children of Bodom
Emmi Silvennoinen – keyboardist of Ensiferum
Jani Stefanovic – guitarist, drummer, keyboardist, and bassist for Miseration and Solution .45, formerly of Crimson Moonlight and Renascent
Markus Toivonen – founder, guitarist, songwriter and backing vocalist of Ensiferum
Timo Tolkki – guitarist and ex-singer of Stratovarius
Eicca Toppinen – cellist of cello-metal band Apocalyptica
Emppu Vuorinen – guitarist of Nightwish
Janne Wirman – keyboard player of Children of Bodom

Opera

Emmy Achté (1876–1924), mezzo-soprano
Aino Ackté (1876–1944), soprano
Ida Basilier-Magelssen (1846–1928), soprano
Kim Borg (1919–2000), bass
Monica Groop (born 1958), mezzo-soprano
Alma Fohström (1856–1936), soprano
Elin Fohström (1868–1949), soprano
Jorma Hynninen (born 1941), baritone
Soile Isokoski (born 1957), soprano
Tom Krause (1934–2013), bass-baritone
Karita Mattila (born 1960), soprano
Matti Salminen (born 1945), bass
Martti Talvela (1935–1989), bass
Tarja Turunen (born 1977), soprano

Other

A–M

 Jonne Aaron – frontman of Negative
 Ismo Alanko – rock musician
Jukka Ammondt – literature professor and musician who has recorded songs of Elvis Presley in Latin and Sumerian.
 Nikke Ankara – rap musician
 Mikko Aspa – lead singer of Deathspell Omega and owner of Northern Heritage label
 Kirill Babitzin (1950–2007)
 Maximilian Theodor Buch – historic academic and nationalist
 Carola – jazz and pop singer
 Elastinen – rap musician, half of the rap duo Fintelligens
 Cheek – rap musician, broke many Spotify records in Finland
 Irwin Goodman a.k.a. Antti Hammarberg (1943–1991) – protest singer
 Sara Forsberg a.k.a. SAARA – Swedish-Finnish American
 Aki Hakala – drummer of The Rasmus
 Hector
 Lasse Heikkilä – composer, songwriter, producer, vocalist and multi-instrumentalist
 Eero Heinonen – bassist of The Rasmus
 Reino Helismaa (1913–1965)
 Janita – soul, pop, and alternative singer-songwriter
 Tomi Joutsen – lead singer of Amorphis
 Markus Kaarlonen – "Captain" keyboardist and producer of rock band Poets of the Fall
 Maria Kalaniemi
 Mika Karppinen – drummer from the band HIM
 Viktor Klimenko
 Samuli Kosminen
 Sakari Kukko
 Mikko Kuustonen – singer-songwriter
 Hildá Länsman (born 1993) – Sámi pop singer
 Juice Leskinen – rock musician
 Mikko Lindström – guitarist from the band HIM
 Jyrki Linnankivi – lead singer of the 69 Eyes
 Jaska Makinen – rhythm guitarist of rock band Poets of the Fall
 Tommy Mansikka-Aho
 Jarkko Martikainen
 Andy McCoy – former guitarist of Hanoi Rocks, rock musician
 Michael Monroe – former singer of Hanoi Rocks, rock musician

N–Z

Sara Nunes – singer
Tuomari Nurmio
Harri Nuutinen
Mikko Paananen – bass player for the rock band HIM
Olga Oinola (1865–1949) – President of the Finnish Women Association
Hanna Pakarinen – Finland's first Idols winner, pop singer
Paleface – rap musician
Maukka Perusjätkä – punk rocker
Mika Pohjola – jazz pianist and composer
Pekka Pohjola
Kimmo Pohjonen
Lauri Porra
Janne Puurtinen – keyboard player from the band HIM
Iiro Rantala
Pauli Rantasalmi – guitarist of The Rasmus
Tapio Rautavaara
Marko Saaresto – lyricist, lead singer of rock band Poets of the Fall
Jari Salminen – drummer of rock band Poets of the Fall
Jari Sillanpää – Finnish "tango king", singer
Sir Christus – former guitarist for the band Negative
Aki Sirkesalo (1962–2004) – singer 
Jani "Hellboy" Snellman – bass guitarist of rock band Poets of the Fall
Kyllikki Solanterä (1908–1965) – popular singer, vocal teacher and lyricist
Topi Sorsakoski – schlager and rock'n'roll singer
Gösta Sundqvist
Jonna Tervomaa – pop singer
Jukka Tolonen
Antti Tuisku – pop musician, Idols star
Olli Tukiainen – lead guitarist of rock band Poets of the Fall
Tellu Turkka
Tarja Turunen – former lead singer of the symphonic metal band Nightwish
Petri Walli (1969–1995)
Juha Watt Vainio
Ville Valo – lead singer of HIM
Edward Vesala (1945–1999) – jazz musician, composer, drummer 
Jussi Heikki Tapio Vuori drummer of the 69 Eyes
Olavi Virta – singer
Laura Voutilainen – pop singer
Maija Vilkkumaa – pop/rock singer
Lauri Ylönen – lead singer of The Rasmus
A. W. Yrjänä – rock singer, bass guitarist, songwriter, poet

Musical groups

The 69 Eyes
Amorphis
Apocalyptica
Apulanta
Blind Channel
Bomfunk MC’s
Children Of Bodom
Darude
HIM
Lordi
Nightwish
Nylon Beat
PMMP
Poets of the Fall
The Rasmus
Sonata Arctica
Stam1na
Stratovarius

Philosophers

Timo Airaksinen
Lili Alanen
Anders Chydenius
Arto Haapala
Jaakko Hintikka
Pekka Himanen
Matti Häyry
Eino Kaila
Raili Kauppi
S. Albert Kivinen
Pentti Linkola
Eeva-Liisa Manner
Ilkka Niiniluoto
Esa Saarinen
J. V. Snellman
Eero Tarasti
Raimo Tuomela
Thomas Wallgren
Edward Westermarck
Georg Henrik von Wright

Politicians

Esko Aho – prime minister 1991–1995
Martti Ahtisaari – United Nations diplomat and mediator; Nobel Peace Prize winner; president of Finland 1994–2000
Karl-August Fagerholm – politician (1901–1984)
Tarja Halonen – First female president of Finland, 2000–2012
Satu Hassi – MEP
Heidi Hautala – MEP
Harri Holkeri – prime minister and UN diplomat
Ville Itälä – MEP
Max Jakobson – UN diplomat
Anneli Jäätteenmäki – prime minister 2003
Kyösti Kallio – president of Finland 1937–1940 (1873–1940)
Urho Kekkonen – president of Finland 1956–1982 (1900–1986)
Mari Kiviniemi – prime minister 2010–2011
Mauno Koivisto – president of Finland 1982–1994
Aleksander von Kothen – senator
Hertta Kuusinen – communist politician (1904–1974)
Otto Ville Kuusinen – head of the communist Terijoki Government, later Soviet politician (1881–1964)
Axel Lille – founder of the Swedish People's Party (1848–1921)
Paavo Lipponen – prime minister 1995–2003, the first speaker of the Finnish Parliament 2003–2007
Carl Gustaf Emil Mannerheim – commander-in-chief, regent, president 1944–1946 (1867–1951)
Martti Miettunen – prime minister 1961–1962 and 1975–1977
Sauli Niinistö – president of Finland 2012–
Juho Kusti Paasikivi – president of Finland 1946–1956 (1870–1956)
Lauri Kristian Relander – president of Finland 1925–1931 (1883–1942)
Elisabeth Rehn – politician
Olli Rehn – commissioner and vice-president of the European Commission
Heikki Ritavuori – assassinated minister (1880–1922)
Risto Ryti – president of Finland 1940–1944 (1889–1956)
Miina Sillanpää – minister
Taisto Sinisalo – communist politician
Helvi Sipilä – UN diplomat
Johan Vilhelm Snellman – writer and senator (1806–1881)
Osmo Soininvaara – minister
Kalevi Sorsa – prime minister (1930–2004)
Kaarlo Juho Ståhlberg – president of Finland 1919–1925 (1865–1952)
Ulf Sundqvist
Pehr Evind Svinhufvud – regent and president of Finland 1931–1937 (1861–1944)
Väinö Tanner – prime minister 1926–1927 (1881–1966)
Oskari Tokoi – prime minister 1917 (1873–1963)
Erkki Tuomioja – foreign minister (2000–2007)
Martti Turunen – Japanese Diet member of Finnish origin 2001–
Matti Vanhanen – prime minister 2003–2010
Johannes Virolainen – prime minister in 1964–1966 (1914–2000)
Hella Wuolijoki – parliamentarian, writer (1886–1954)

Scientists

Lars Valerian Ahlfors – mathematician, Fields Medalist 1936 (1907–1996)
Väinö Auer – explorer, geologist, geographer (1895–1981)
Matthias Castren – ethnologist (1813–1852)
Anders Chydenius – classical liberal (1729–1803)
Kari Enqvist – cosmologist
Teppo Felin – professor at the University of Oxford
Johan Gadolin – chemist (1760–1852)
Ragnar Granit – medicine, Nobelist (1900–1991)
Hilma Granqvist – anthropologist (1890–1972)
Ilkka Hanski – Crafoord Prize winning ecologist (1953–2016)
Bengt Holmström – economist, Nobelist (1949–)
Kimmo Innanen – astronomer (1937-2011)
Pehr Kalm – botanist (1716–1779)
Teuvo Kohonen – neurocomputing pioneer (1934–)
Anders Johan Lexell – mathematician, astronomer (1740–1784)
Ernst Lindelöf – mathematician, researcher of function theory and topology (1870–1946)
Olli Lounasmaa – physicist, researcher of low-temperature physics (1930–2002)
Hjalmar Mellin – mathematician (1854–1933)
Risto Näätänen – psychologist and neuroscientist (born 1939)
Rolf Nevanlinna – mathematician (1895–1980)
Nils Gustaf Nordenskiöld – mineralogist (1792–1866)
Adolf Erik Nordenskiöld – polar explorer, political refugee in Sweden (1832–1901)
Gunnar Nordström – theoretical physicist (1881–1923)
Aili Nurminen – meteorologist (1896–1972)
Liisi Oterma – astronomer (1915–2001)
Leena Palotie – gene scientist (1952–2010)
Simo Parpola – orientalist, assyriologist
Tuija I. Pulkkinen – space scientist (born 1962)
Helena Ranta – pathologist, forensic dentist
Eric Tigerstedt – inventor, Thomas Edison of Finland (1887–1925)
Kari S. Tikka – justice and finance professor (1944–2006)
Esko Valtaoja – astronomer
Tatu Vanhanen – political scientist (1929–2015)
Artturi Ilmari Virtanen – chemist, Nobelist (1895–1973)
Vilho Väisälä – mathematician, inventor of meteorological instruments (1889–1969)
Yrjö Väisälä – astronomer, meteorologist (1891–1971)
Edvard Westermarck – philosopher, sociologist (1862–1939)
Joy Wolfram – nanoscientist (1989–)
Arvo Ylppö – pediatrician (1887–1992)

Soldiers

Aksel Airo – general (1898–1985)
Adolf Ehrnrooth – general (1905–2004)
Axel Heinrichs – general (1890–1965)
Simo Häyhä – first lieutenant, sharpshooter 505 confirmed sniper kills (1905–2002)
Eino Ilmari Juutilainen – pilot, twice knight of Mannerheim cross
Jorma Karhunen – pilot, aviation writer
Jussi Kekkonen – major, younger brother of president Urho Kekkonen (1910–1962)
Ruben Lagus – major general (1896–1956)
Carl Gustaf Emil Mannerheim – marshal of Finland (1867–1951)
Vilho Petter Nenonen – general (1883–1960)
Karl Lennart Oesch – lieutenant general (1892–1978)
Mika Peltonen – brigadier general (from 2005)
Jorma Sarvanto – fighter pilot, World War II ace
Ensio Siilasvuo – general (1922–2001)
Hjalmar Siilasvuo – general (1892–1947)
Georg Magnus Sprengtporten – general (1740–1819)
Torsten Stålhandske – commander of Hakkapelites (1594–1644)
Paavo Susitaival – lieutenant colonel (1896–1993)
Lauri Sutela – general
Paavo Talvela – general (1897–1973)
Lauri Törni (a.k.a. Larry Thorne) – captain (1919–1965)
Rudolf Walden – general (1878–1946)
Kurt Martti Wallenius – major general (1893–1984)
Hans Wind – pilot, twice knight of Mannerheim cross
Harald Öhquist – lieutenant general (1891–1971)
Hugo Österman – lieutenant general (1892–1975)
Karl Fredrik Wilkama – general of the infantry (1876–1947)
Aimo Koivunen – corporal (1939–1944)

Sportspeople

Athletics

Ashprihanal Pekka Aalto – ultramarathoner and extreme endurance athlete
Arto Bryggare – hurdling athlete
Sari Essayah – race walker, world champion
Tommi Evilä – long jumper
Arsi Harju – shot putter, Olympic champion
Eduard Hämäläinen – decathlete
Arto Härkönen – javelin thrower, Olympic champion
Gunnar Höckert – runner, Olympic champion (1910–1940)
Volmari Iso-Hollo – runner, two Olympic gold medals (1907–1969)
Akilles Järvinen – decathlete (1905–1943)
Matti Järvinen – javelin thrower, Olympic champion (1909–1985)
Verner Järvinen – discus thrower, Olympic champion (1870–1941)
Kaarlo Kangasniemi – weightlifter, Olympic champion 1968 Mexico
Olli-Pekka Karjalainen – hammer thrower
Veikko Karvonen – marathon runner (Boston Marathon winner 1954)
Elias Katz – runner, Olympic champion (3,000m team steeplechase) and silver (3,000m steeplechase) (1901–1947)
Jukka Keskisalo – runner
Kimmo Kinnunen – javelin thrower, world champion
Hannes Kolehmainen – runner, four Olympic gold medals (1889–1966)
Valentin Kononen – race walker, world champion
Tapio Korjus – javelin thrower, Olympic champion
Teodor Koskenniemi – runner, Olympic champion (1887–1965)
Paavo Kotila – marathon runner (Boston Marathon winner 1960)
Harri Larva – runner, Olympic champion (1906–1980)
Lauri Lehtinen – runner, Olympic champion (1908–1973)
Eero Lehtonen – pentathlete, two Olympic gold medals (1898–1959)
Heikki Liimatainen – runner, two Olympic gold medals (1894–1980)
Tiina Lillak – javelin thrower, world champion
Toivo Loukola – runner, Olympic champion (1902–1984)
Taisto Mäki – long-distance runner, multiple world record holder (1910–1979)
Jonni Myyrä – javelin thrower, two Olympic gold medals (1892–1955)
Pauli Nevala – javelin thrower, Olympic champion
Elmer Niklander – discus thrower and shot putter, Olympic champion (1890–1942)
Paavo Nurmi – runner, nine Olympic gold medals (1897–1973)
Eino Oksanen – marathon runner (Boston Marathon winner 1959, 1961,1962)
Aki Parviainen – javelin thrower, world champion
Tero Pitkämäki – javelin thrower, world champion
Ville Pörhölä – shot putter, Olympic champion (1897–1964)
Heli Rantanen – javelin thrower, Olympic champion
Tapio Rautavaara – javelin thrower, Olympic champion (1915–1979)
Ville Ritola – runner, five Olympic gold medals (1896–1982)
Seppo Räty – javelin thrower, three Olympic medals, world champion
Julius Saaristo – javelin thrower, Olympic champion (1891–1969)
Ilmari Salminen – runner, Olympic champion (1902–1986)
Albin Stenroos – marathon runner, Olympic champion (1889–1971)
Olavi Suomalainen – marathon runner (Boston Marathon winner 1972)
Armas Taipale – discus thrower, Olympic champion (1890–1976)
Juha Tiainen – hammer thrower, Olympic champion
Abraham Tokazier – sprinter
Vilho Tuulos – triple jumper, Olympic champion (1895–1967)
Pekka Vasala – runner, Olympic champion
Lasse Virén – runner, four Olympic gold medals
Paavo Yrjölä – decathlete, Olympic champion

Basketball

Petteri Koponen – basketball player, first Finnish first round pick in NBA draft
Lauri Markkanen – basketball player, currently with the NBA's Utah Jazz
Hanno Möttölä – basketball player, first Finnish NBA player
 Miron Ruina (born 1998) – Finnish-Israeli basketball player

Football

Alexei Eremenko Jr.
Roman Eremenko
Mikael Forssell
Lukáš Hrádecký
Sami Hyypiä
Jonatan Johansson
Jussi Jääskeläinen
Joonas Kolkka
Shefki Kuqi
Jari Litmanen
Antti Niemi
Mixu Paatelainen
Petri Pasanen
Juhani Peltonen
Roni Porokara
Aki Riihilahti
Aulis Rytkönen
Teemu Tainio
Niilo Tammisalo
Hannu Tihinen
Mika Väyrynen
Mika Ääritalo
Teemu Pukki
Anssi Jaakkola
Markku Kanerva
Joel Pohjanpalo
Glen Kamara

Ice hockey

A–K

Antti Aalto
Sebastian Aho
Sami Aittokallio
 Aleksander Barkov
Aki Berg
Sean Bergenheim
Timo Blomqvist
Niklas Bäckström
Mikko Eloranta
Valtteri Filppula
Mikael Granlund
Tuomas Grönman
Anne Haanpää
Matti Hagman
Niklas Hagman
Maija Hassinen-Sullanmaa
Riku Hahl
Sanni Hakala
Teemu Hartikainen
Ilkka Heikkinen
Miro Heiskanen
Riku Helenius
Anne Helin
Raimo Helminen
Jukka Hentunen
Jenni Hiirikoski
Roope Hintz
Kim Hirschovits
Elisa Holopainen
Venla Hovi
Jani Hurme
Erik Hämäläinen
Kirsi Hänninen
Marianne Ihalainen
Jarkko Immonen
Mira Jalosuo
Jesse Joensuu
Jussi Jokinen
Olli Jokinen
Timo Jutila
Hannu Järvenpää
Iiro Järvi
Tomi Kallio
Niko Kapanen
Sami Kapanen
Kasperi Kapanen
Jere Karalahti
Michelle Karvinen
Anni Keisala
Esa Keskinen
Markus Ketterer
Satu Kiipeli
Anna Kilponen
Marko Kiprusoff
Miikka Kiprusoff
Mikko Koivu
Saku Koivu – current IOC member
Leo Komarov
Petri Kontiola
Lauri Korpikoski
Sari Krooks
Mira Kuisma
Lasse Kukkonen
Jari Kurri

L–Q

Teemu Laakso
Antti Laaksonen
Erkki Laine
Patrik Laine
Nelli Laitinen
Janne Laukkanen
Esa Lehikoinen
Tero Lehterä
Jere Lehtinen
Erkki Lehtonen
Kari Lehtonen
Mikko Lehtonen (born 1978)
Mikko Lehtonen (born 1987)
Ville Leino
Juha Lind
Esa Lindell
Perttu Lindgren
Rosa Lindstedt
Jyrki Lumme
Mikko Luoma
Toni Lydman
Pentti Lund
Lauri Marjamäki
Sari Marjamäki (née Fisk)
Jussi Markkanen
Terhi Mertanen
Antti Miettinen
Reijo Mikkolainen
Jarmo Myllys
Olli Määttä
Mikko Mäkelä
Niina Mäkinen
Antti Niemi
Antti-Jussi Niemi
Saara Niemi (née Tuominen)
Mika Nieminen
Petra Nieminen
Ville Nieminen
Janne Niinimaa
Antero Niittymäki
Janne Niskala
Tanja Niskanen
Petteri Nokelainen
Mika Noronen
Fredrik Norrena
Petteri Nummelin
Teppo Numminen
Pasi Nurminen
Emma Nuutinen
Janne Ojanen
Suvi Ollikainen
Joni Ortio
Kai Ortio
Oskar Osala
Marko Palo
Oona Parviainen
Mari Pehkonen
Ville Peltonen
Heidi Pelttari
Harri Pesonen
Janne Pesonen
Tuomas Pihlman
Antti Pihlström
Joni Pitkänen
Mariia Posa
Jesse Puljujärvi
Tuula Puputti
Mika Pyörälä
Marja-Helena Pälvilä
Timo Pärssinen

R–Z

Isa Rahunen
Annina Rajahuhta
Tiina Ranne
Karoliina Rantamäki
Mikko Rantanen
Joonas Rask
Tuukka Rask
Katja Riipi
Pekka Rinne
Kimmo Rintanen
Jani Rita
Arto Ruotanen
Reijo Ruotsalainen
Christian Ruuttu
Jarkko Ruutu
Tuomo Ruutu
Jussi Rynnäs
Noora Räty
Meeri Räisänen
Karri Rämö
Noora Räty
Saila Saari
Mari Saarinen
Simo Saarinen
Maria Saarni
Riikka Sallinen (née Nieminen, previously Välilä)
Anssi Salmela
Tony Salmelainen
Sami Salo
Tommi Santala
Eve Savander
Ronja Savolainen
Teemu Selänne
Essi Sievers
Hanne Sikiö
Jenna Silvonen
Ilkka Sinisalo
Ville Sirén
Petri Skriko
Liisa-Maria Sneck
Mika Strömberg
Kai Suikkanen
Ari Sulander
Raimo Summanen
Eveliina Suonpää
Timo Susi
Keijo Säilynoja
Sara Säkkinen
Nora Tallus
Jukka Tammi
Vilma Tanskanen
Susanna Tapani
Saija Tarkki
Emma Terho (née Laaksonen) – current IOC member
Teuvo Teräväinen
Esa Tikkanen
Nina Tikkinen
Kimmo Timonen
Jari Torkki
Vesa Toskala
Noora Tulus
Minttu Tuominen
Satu Tuominen
Pekka Tuomisto
Antti Törmänen
Petra Vaarakallio
Vilma Vaattovaara
Viivi Vainikka
Anna Vanhatalo
Petri Varis
Sami Vatanen
Ella Viitasuo
Hannu Virta
Päivi Virta (previously Halonen)
Jukka Virtanen
Marjo Voutilainen
Linda Välimäki
Ossi Väänänen
Petteri Wirtanen
Juha Ylönen

Motorsports

Mika Ahola – enduro rider (1974–2012)
Pentti Airikkala – rally driver
Markku Alén – rally driver
Samuli Aro – enduro rider
Valtteri Bottas – Formula One driver
Toni Gardemeister – rally driver
Marcus Grönholm – rally driver. 2 time World Champion
Mikko Hirvonen – rally driver
Mika Häkkinen – Formula One driver 2 time World Champion
Mika Kallio – motorcycle racer
Juha Kankkunen – rally driver. 4 time World Champion
Leo Kinnunen – Formula One driver
Heikki Kovalainen – Formula One driver
Teuvo Länsivuori – motorcycle racer
Jari-Matti Latvala – rally driver
JJ Lehto – Formula One driver
Hannu Mikkola – rally driver
Heikki Mikkola – motocross racer
Timo Mäkinen – rally driver
Tommi Mäkinen – rally driver. 4 time World Champion
Kauko Nieminen – speedway racer
Taru Rinne – motorcycle racer
Keke Rosberg – Formula One driver, World Champion 1982
Harri Rovanperä – rally driver
Kimi Räikkönen – Formula One driver, World Champion in 2007; rally driver; NASCAR driver
Jarno Saarinen – motorcycle racer (1945–1973)
Juha Salminen – enduro rider
Mika Salo – Formula One driver
Timo Salonen – rally driver
Kari Tiainen – enduro rider
Henri Toivonen – rally driver (1956–1986)
Ari Vatanen – rally driver

Rowing

Yrjö Hietanen – rower, two Olympic gold medals
Pertti Karppinen – rower, three Olympic gold medals
Kurt Wires – rower, two Olympic gold medals (1919–1991)

Winter sports

Janne Ahonen – ski jumper
Antti Autti – snowboarder
Eero Ettala – snowboarder, 2006 World Champion
Veikko Hakulinen – cross-country skier, three Olympic gold medals
Janne Happonen – ski jumper
Heikki Hasu – Nordic combined, two Olympic gold medals
Matti Hautamäki – ski jumper
Antti Hyvärinen – ski jumper
Kalevi Hämäläinen – cross-country skier
Risto Jussilainen – ski jumper
Marjatta Kajosmaa – cross-country skier
Veikko Kankkonen – ski jumper
Jouko Karjalainen – Nordic combined
Klaes Karppinen – cross-country skier
Kalle Keituri – ski jumper
Harri Kirvesniemi – cross-country skier
Marja-Liisa Kirvesniemi – cross-country skier, three Olympic gold medals
Anssi Koivuranta – Nordic combined
Kiira Korpi – figure skater
Markku Koski – snowboarder and Olympic bronze medalist (Men's Snowboarding Halfpipe)
Kai Kovaljeff – ski jumper
Hilkka Kuntola – cross-country skier
Risto Laakkonen – ski jumper
Janne Lahtela – freestyle skier
Mika Laitinen – ski jumper
Samppa Lajunen – Olympic gold medalist (Nordic combined) and (sprint)
Ville Larinto – ski jumper
Hannu Manninen – Nordic combined
Marjo Matikainen-Kallström – cross-country skier
Juha Mieto – cross-country skier
Olli Muotka – ski jumper
Kaija Mustonen – speed skater
Mika Myllylä – cross-country skier
Eero Mäntyranta – cross-country skier, three Olympic gold medals
Toni Nieminen – ski jumper, two Olympic gold medals
Ari-Pekka Nikkola – ski jumper, two Olympic gold medals
Matti Nykänen – ski jumper, four Olympic gold medals, one Olympic silver medal
Harri Olli– ski jumper
Kalle Palander – skier
Peetu Piiroinen – snowboarder, one Olympic silver medal (halfpipe)
Tanja Poutiainen – skier
Jari Puikkonen – ski jumper
Siiri Rantanen – cross-country skier
Marjut Rolig (née Lukkarinen) – cross-country skier, one olympic gold- and silver medal
Mikko Ronkainen – freestyle skier
Janne Ryynänen – Nordic combined
Veli Saarinen – cross-country skier
Julius Skutnabb – speed skater
Jani Soininen – ski jumper
Helena Takalo – cross-country skier
Jaakko Tallus – Nordic combined
Clas Thunberg – speed skater, five Olympic gold medals
Jouko Törmänen – ski jumper
Tuomo Ylipulli – ski jumper
Kaisa Mäkäräinen – biathlete, one-time World Champion, 6 total medals at World Championships

Other

Paavo Aaltonen – gymnast, three Olympic gold medals (1919–1962)
Jouko Ahola – World's strongest man champion twice
Patrik Antonius – High-stakes poker player
Kalle Anttila – wrestler, two Olympic gold medals (1887–1975)
Kike Elomaa – IFBB professional bodybuilder
Veikka Gustafsson – mountain climber
Veikko Huhtanen – gymnast, three Olympic gold medals (1919–1976)
Robin Hull – snooker player
Mikko Ilonen – golfer
Mika Immonen – pool player
Antti Kasvio – swimmer
Minna Kauppi – orienteer, nine-time World Champion
Marko Kemppainen – skeet shooter
Mika Koivuniemi – ten-pin bowler
Väinö Kokkinen – wrestler, two Olympic gold medals (1899–1967)
Pentti Linnosvuo – sport shooter, two Olympic gold medals
Matti Mattsson – swimmer, one World Championship bronze medal
Jarkko Nieminen – tennis player
Lauri "Tahko" Pihkala – inventor of Finnish baseball (1888–1981)
Kustaa Pihlajamäki – wrestler, two Olympic gold medals (1902–1944)
Jarno Pihlava – swimmer
Arto Saari – pro skateboarder
Ale Saarvala – gymnast, two Olympic gold medals
Kasperi Salo – badminton player
Heikki Savolainen – gymnast, two Olympic gold medals (1907–1998)
Hanna-Maria Seppälä – swimmer, World champion
Jani Sievinen – swimmer, one Olympic silver and many other international medals, mostly gold medals. Most decorated Finnish swimmer
Markku Uusipaavalniemi – curler
Anu Viheriäranta – ballet dancer
Antti Viitikko – badminton player
Janne Virtanen – world's strongest man champion
Emil Väre – wrestler, two Olympic gold medals (1885–1974)
Verner Weckman – wrestler, two Olympic gold medals (1882–1968)

Theologians, clergymen

Mikael Agricola
Bishop Henry
Lauri Ingman
Markku Koivisto
Lars Levi Læstadius
Leo
Kari Mäkinen
Jukka Paarma
Antti Rantamaa
Paavo Ruotsalainen
John Vikström

Writers

Juhani Aho – first professional writer
Helena Anhava – prolific poet, writer, translator (1925-2018)
Jean M. Auel – American writer of Finnish descent, born as Jean Marie Untinen
Minna Canth – author (1844–1897)
Bo Carpelan
Marco Casagrande
Jörn Donner – author and politician
Anna Edelheim – journalist
Elsa Enäjärvi-Haavio (1901–1951), folklorist and cultural critic
Seikko Eskola – historian
Pentti Haanpää
Aarne Haapakoski – pulp writer with pseudonym Outsider
Paavo Haavikko
Saima Harmaja – poet (1913–1937)
Laila Hietamies
Veikko Huovinen
Antti Hyry
Anna-Leena Härkönen
Risto Isomäki – science fiction writer
Tove Jansson – children's author of Moomin fame (1914–2001)
Maria Jotuni (1880–1943)
Markus Kajo – comedy writer (born 1957)
Taito Kantonen
Volter Kilpi
Marko Kitti
Aleksis Kivi – first significant author in Finnish (1834–1872)
Leena Krohn
Torsti Lehtinen – writer and philosopher
Joel Lehtonen
Eino Leino (1878–1926)
Rosa Liksom
Väinö Linna – author of The Unknown Soldier (1920–1992)
Johannes Linnankoski
Elias Lönnrot – compiled the Kalevala (1802–1884)
Veijo Meri
Barbara Catharina Mjödh
Knud Möller
Jukka Nevakivi
Pertti Nieminen
Carita Nyström (1940–2019), Swedish-speaking writer
Sofi Oksanen
Arto Paasilinna
Erno Paasilinna
Olavi Paavolainen
Onni Palaste – war novelist (1917–2009)
Antti Puhakka – national romantic poet and politician (1816–1893)
Kalle Päätalo (1919–2000)
Susanne Ringell
Johan Ludvig Runeberg – national poet (1804–1877)
Pentti Saarikoski
Frans Emil Sillanpää – Nobelist (1888–1964)
Johanna Sinisalo
Tommy Tabermann – also known from TV series Have I Got News For You a.k.a. Uutisvuoto
Marton Taiga – pseudonym of Martti Löfberg
Jari Tervo – also known from TV series Have I Got News For You a.k.a. Uutisvuoto
Märta Tikkanen
Zacharias Topelius – author and historian (1818–1898)
Jouko Turkka
Antti Tuuri
Kaari Utrio
Hella Wuolijoki
Mika Waltari (1908–1979)
Lauri Viita – poet and novelist known for extreme rhyme skill
Kjell Westö

Other notables

 Simo Aalto – stage magician
 Kaarlo Bergbom – theatre director, founder of the Finnish National Theatre
 Ior Bock – eccentric
 Donner family
 Karl Fazer – confectionery manufacturer
 Janina Frostell – model, sex symbol and singer
 Tony Halme – show wrestler (stage name Ludwig Borga), politician
 Pirkko Hämäläinen, Ambassador to Austria
 Seppo Hentilä – historian
 Jukka Hilden – member of The Dudesons
 Toni Jerrman – science fiction critic
 Pepe Jürgens – sports commentator
 Vesa Kanniainen – economist and academic
 Liisa Kauppinen (born 1939) – human rights activist
 Helena Kekkonen (1926–2014), peace activist
 Kuikka-Koponen – trickster and conjurer
 Armi Kuusela – Miss Universe 1952
 Jarno Laasala – member of The Dudesons
 Aarne Lakomaa – aircraft designer (1914–2001)
 Jarno "Jarppi"/"Jarno2" Leppälä – member of The Dudesons
 Arvi Lind – newscaster
 Fanni Luukkonen – leader of Lotta Svärd (1882–1947)
 Venla Luukkonen – Brazilian jiu-jitsu world champion
 Sophie Mannerheim – nurse (1863–1928)
 Tuomas "Tunna" Milonoff – starring in the Finnish television program Madventures
 Väinö Myllyrinne – the tallest Finn, 248 cm (1909–1963)
 Larin Paraske – poem singer
 Hannu-Pekka "HP" Parviainen – member of The Dudesons
 Arndt Pekurinen – pacifist (1905–1941)
 Anne Marie Pohtamo – Miss Universe 1975
 Riku Rantala – starring in the Finnish television program Madventures
 Krisse Salminen – comedian and talk show hostess
 Santa Claus
 Eugen Schauman – assassin who killed Nikolai Ivanovich Bobrikov (1875–1904)
 Tabe Slioor – socialite, reporter, photographer; founded the first gossip magazine in Finland
 Nils Torvalds – journalist
 Ole Torvalds – journalist (1916–1995)
 Teppo Turkki – futurologist
 Nils-Aslak Valkeapää – Sami activist (1943–2001)
 Folke West – traveller

See also

 List of Swedish-speaking Finns
 List of people by nationality
 Finland

References